2nd Uruguayan Film Critics Association Awards
The 2nd Uruguayan Film Critics Association Awards were held in 2002.

Winners
Best Film (tie): Hable con ella (Talk to Her), Spain
Best Film (tie): Rang-e khoda (The Color of Paradise), Iran
Best First Work: No Man's Land
Best Latin American Film: Coronación (Coronation), Chile
Best Uruguayan Film: El último tren (The Last Train)

References

External links
IMDb - Uruguayan Film Critics Association 2002

 

Uruguayan Film Critics Association Awards
2002 film awards